Gabriel Enrique Gómez Girón (born 29 May 1984) is a Panamanian former footballer who played as a defensive midfielder.

His own notwithstanding, he played professionally in six countries in a 19-year career, mainly Colombia and Portugal.

Gómez was Panama's all-time record cap holder, appearing in 149 internationals and representing the nation in seven Gold Cup tournaments and the 2018 World Cup.

Club career
In his early career, Panama City-born Gómez – nicknamed Gavilán (Hawk)– rarely settled with a club, playing in both his country and Colombia. In 2007, he moved to Portugal and signed for C.F. Os Belenenses initially on a one-year loan, from Independiente Santa Fe whom he had joined in December 2005.

Gómez made his Primeira Liga debut on 20 August 2007 in a 1–1 draw at Associação Naval 1º de Maio, being relatively used during his three-year stint as the Lisbon side were eventually relegated at the end of the 2009–10 season. In the last minutes of the following summer transfer window, he moved to Cyprus and signed with Ermis Aradippou FC, reuniting with former Belenenses teammate Wender.

In August 2011, after a spell back in Colombia with La Equidad alongside countrymen Gabriel Torres and Román Torres, Gómez teamed up with compatriot Blas Pérez at Mexican Ascenso MX side Indios de Ciudad Juárez. He signed for the Philadelphia Union of Major League Soccer on 21 December 2011, scoring his first league goal in the season opener against the Portland Timbers (3–1 away loss).

Gómez returned to Colombia in December 2012, to play for Atlético Junior. He continued changing clubs and countries in quick succession in the following years, representing San Francisco F.C. and C.S. Herediano.

International career
Gómez represented the Panamanian under-20 team at the 2003 FIFA World Youth Championship in the United Arab Emirates. He made his debut for the full side in a game against El Salvador in the 2003 UNCAF Nations Cup, and went on to play for his country on more than 140 occasions, including in 27 FIFA World Cup qualification matches.

Gómez was named in the 23-man squad for the 2018 World Cup in Russia. He made his debut in the competition on 18 June at the age of 34 years and 20 days, playing the entire 3–0 defeat to Belgium in the group stage; later that month, he announced his retirement from international play.

Personal life
Gómez married former model Ingrid González, sister of former international goalkeeper Donaldo González, fathering two children.

Career statistics

Club

International

International goals

Honours
Panama
CONCACAF Gold Cup runner-up: 2005, 2013; third place 2015

See also
List of men's footballers with 100 or more international caps

References

External links

1984 births
Living people
Sportspeople from Panama City
Panamanian footballers
Association football midfielders
Liga Panameña de Fútbol players
San Francisco F.C. players
Tauro F.C. players
Sporting San Miguelito players
Categoría Primera A players
Envigado F.C. players
Deportivo Pasto footballers
Deportivo Pereira footballers
Independiente Santa Fe footballers
La Equidad footballers
Atlético Junior footballers
Deportes Tolima footballers
Atlético Bucaramanga footballers
Primeira Liga players
C.F. Os Belenenses players
Cypriot First Division players
Ermis Aradippou FC players
Indios de Ciudad Juárez footballers
Major League Soccer players
Philadelphia Union players
Liga FPD players
C.S. Herediano footballers
C.S. Cartaginés players
Panama international footballers
2003 UNCAF Nations Cup players
2005 UNCAF Nations Cup players
2005 CONCACAF Gold Cup players
2007 CONCACAF Gold Cup players
2009 CONCACAF Gold Cup players
2011 Copa Centroamericana players
2011 CONCACAF Gold Cup players
2013 CONCACAF Gold Cup players
2014 Copa Centroamericana players
2015 CONCACAF Gold Cup players
Copa América Centenario players
2017 CONCACAF Gold Cup players
2018 FIFA World Cup players
Panamanian expatriate footballers
Expatriate footballers in Colombia
Expatriate footballers in Portugal
Expatriate footballers in Cyprus
Expatriate footballers in Mexico
Expatriate soccer players in the United States
Expatriate footballers in Costa Rica
Panamanian expatriate sportspeople in Colombia
Panamanian expatriate sportspeople in Mexico
Panamanian expatriate sportspeople in the United States
FIFA Century Club